Hansraj College is a constituent college of the University of Delhi, in Delhi, India. Departments include science, liberal arts and commerce.

History
The  College was founded on 26 July 1948 in memory of the prominent Indian educator and nationalist Mahatma Hansraj. Initially started as an institution for men, the college became co-educational in 1978. With over 3,000 students, it is one of the largest constituent colleges of the University of Delhi. For years Hans Raj College has been ranked among the Top-10 colleges of India in all three disciplines. At the celebration of its 69th Foundation Day, Naveen Jindal, industrialist and alumnus, announced that Hans Raj College would become the first college in Delhi University to hoist the national flag on its premises. The college hoisted the Monumental Flag on 25 January 2017 which happens to be the second Monumental Flagpole in Delhi after CP. The flag was hoisted by MP Naveen Jindal, an alumnus of the college and founder of Flag Foundation of India (FFOI).

Ranking
It was ranked fourteenth among all the colleges in India by NIRF in 2022, and ranked fifth in Indian arts colleges by India Today in 2022.

Academics

The college offers undergraduate and postgraduate courses in various streams. These are B.A, B.A (Hons), B.Sc, B.Sc (Hons) and B.Com (Hons) at the UG level. And M.A, M.Sc and M.Com at the PG level.

It also offers job-oriented add-on certificate courses. These include: Radio Jockeying, Anchoring & TV Journalism; Acting and Filmmaking; Mass Communication, Advertising & Marketing.

The college receives support under the strengthening component in relation to the Star College initiative of the Department of Biotechnology, Government of India. In addition to this, the college has worked on the future publication of the research journal "Hans Shodh Sudha" to publish research in fields across the sciences, commerce and arts. The Finance and Economics Research Cell of the college also conducts programs to promote undergraduate research in these fields.

Admission process
Hansraj College undergoes the standard admissions process of the University of Delhi. In order to apply to this college for an undergraduate course, the student has to fill out a central form that is released by the university itself. After a few weeks of the deadline of the forms, Delhi University publicly releases cut off lists for each individual course for all of the undergraduate courses across the university.

Old admission process:- A student wishing to apply for a course at Hansraj can look at the cut-off and matches his or her 12th-grade percentage with the same. If the 12th-grade percentage is equal to or greater than the percentage in the cut-off, the student is eligible. Generally, the cutoff percentage lies at ~97% in the 12th Class Finals, this process is officially not applicable after 2022-23 session since the introduction of CUET examination.

New admission process:- As there is a change in the admission process due to introduction of CUET examination, the entrance test shall be sole determiner of the admission at any college in University of Delhi including Hansraj College and 12th results shall be considered for eligibility and tie breaker case only (if applicable).

Sports

The college has facilities for both outdoor and indoor games. It has a sports ground and a Basketball court between the college and the hostel premises. It also possess an indoor badminton court and an indoor shooting range. The student have won university, state and national level championships in pistol shooting, archery (w), water polo, basketball, badminton, cricket, etc. The college won the Chancellor's Trophy in 2003–2004, 2004-2005 and for last four academic sessions from 2011 to 2015 for overall excellence in sports. Sport facilities are made available to all students under the program: Games For All.

Notable alumni

 Anurag Kashyapfilmmaker, screenwriter, producer, actor
 Abhinandan Sekhrientrepreneur, journalist
 Abhinav Kashyapfilmmaker
 Aditya Jhaentrepreneur
 Ajay Makenformer MP, former Sports Minister
 Anil Aggrawalforensic pathologist
 Aarti Bajajfilm editor
 Palash Senactor, medical doctor, musician
 Gunjan Saxenaflight lieutenant Gunjan Saxena is the first woman Indian Air Force (IAF) officer to enter a war zone.
 Gopal SubramaniamSolicitor General of India
 Jai Prakash AgarwalMember of Parliament, Chairman House Committee, LS Indian Political Party-Congress Party
 Kabir Sadanandactor, director
 Kiren RijijuMP, union minister
 Kushal Tandonactor
 Rajesh Khattaractor
 Munish Chandra Purimathematician (writer and philosopher)
 Naveen Jindal
 Partha DasguptaFrank Ramsey Professor (Economics), Cambridge University
 Parvin Dabasactor
 Pavan Malhotraactor
 Rannvijay Singhactor, VJ MTV India
 Raveesh Kumardiplomat, former Ministry of External Affairs spokesperson, currently Ambassador of India to Finland and Estonia
 Richard RekhyChief Executive Officer of KPMG in India
 Rohan Mehraactor, model
 Sangeeta Malhotraastrophysicist
 Sabyasachi Chakrabartyactor
 Sandeep Chaudharypara-athlete
 Shah Rukh Khanactor
 Sheeba Chadhaactress
 Shiney Ahujaactor
 Susmit Senmusician, Indian Ocean
 Tarsem SinghIndian director
 Vineet Bajpaifounder and CEO of TBWA Worldwide
 Vijay Kumar Malhotrapolitician BJP Indian Political Party
 Vinod Duajournalist
 Sushil Kumar (biologist)geneticist and Shanti Swarup Bhatnagar Prize recipient
 V. K. DadhwalISRO scientist (writer and trainer)
 Pallavi Joshifilm and television actress (of Bharat Ek Khoj Fame)

See also
 St. Stephen's College, New Delhi
 Lady Shri Ram College for Women, New Delhi

References

External links
 

Educational institutions established in 1948
Universities and colleges in Delhi
Delhi University
Commerce colleges in India
1948 establishments in India